Cerambycinae is a subfamily of the longhorn beetle family (Cerambycidae). The subfamily has a world-wide distribution including: Asia, Europe and the Americas (with 430 species in 130 genera in the neotropical realm). Within the family, the only subfamily of comparable diversity is the Lamiinae.

Distribution 
Cerambycines are found worldwide; in the Americas, especially widely distributed in the neotropical regions.

Identification 
The major distinguishing factors are the bluntness of the last segment of the maxillary palp, its slanting or near vertical face, the rounded pronotum, and the elytra are often the widest in the middle.

Tribes 
The subfamily Cerambycinae contains the following tribes:

 Acangassuini Galileo & Martins, 2001
 Achrysonini Lacordaire, 1869
 Agallissini LeConte, 1873
 Alanizini Di Iorio, 2003
 Amphoecini Breuning, 1951
 Anaglyptini Lacordaire, 1869
 Aphanasiini Lacordaire, 1868
 Aphneopini Lacordaire, 1868
 Auxesini Lacordaire, 1872
 Basipterini Fragoso, Monne & Campos Seabra, 1987
 Bimiini Lacordaire, 1868
 Bothriospilini Lane, 1950
 Brachypteromini Sama, 2008
 Callichromatini Blanchard, 1845
 Callidiini Mulsant, 1839
 Callidiopini Lacordaire, 1868
 Cerambycini Latreille, 1802
 Certallini Fairmaire, 1864
 Chlidonini Waterhouse, 1879
 Cleomenini Lacordaire, 1868
 Clytini Mulsant, 1839
 Coelarthrini Lacordaire, 1869
 Compsocerini Thomson, 1864
 Coptommatini Lacordaire, 1869
 Curiini LeConte, 1873
 Dedyini Lepesme & Breuning, 1955
 Deilini Fairmaire, 1864
 Dejanirini Lacordaire, 1868
 Diorini Lane, 1950
 Distichocerini Pascoe, 1867
 Dodecosini Aurivillius, 1912
 Dryobiini Linsley, 1964
 Dychophyiini Gistel, 1848
 Eburiini Blanchard, 1845
 Ectenessini Martins, 1998
 Elaphidiini Thomson 1864
 Eligmodermini Lacordaire, 1868
 Erlandiini Aurivillius, 1912
 Eroschemini Lacordaire, 1868
 Eumichthini Linsley, 1940
 Gahaniini Quentin & Villiers, 1969
 Glaucytini Lacordaire, 1868
 Graciliini Mulsant, 1839
 Hesperophanini Mulsant, 1839
 Hesthesini Pascoe, 1867
 Heteropsini Lacordaire 1868
 Hexoplonini Martins, 2006
 Holopleurini Chemsak & Linsley, 1974
 Holopterini Lacordaire, 1868
 Hyboderini Linsley, 1940
 Hylotrupini Rose, 1983
 Ibidionini Thomson, 1861
 Ideratini Martins & Napp, 2009
 Lissonotini Thomson, 1860
 Luscosmodicini Martins, 2003
 Macronini Lacordaire, 1868
 Megacoelini Quentin & Villiers, 1969
 Methiini Thomson, 1860
 Molorchini Mulsant, 1863
 Mythodini Lacordaire, 1868
 Necydalopsini Lacordaire, 1868
 Neocorini Martins, 2005
 Neostenini Lacordaire, 1868
 Obriini Mulsant, 1839
 Oedenoderini Aurivillius, 1912
 Oemini Pascoe, 1869
 Opsimini LeConte, 1813
 Oxycoleini Martins & Galileo, 2003
 Paraholopterini Martins, 1997
 Phalotini Lacordaire, 1868
 Phlyctaenodini Lacordaire, 1868
 Phoracanthini Newman, 1840
 Phyllarthriini Lepesme & Breuning, 1956
 Piezocerini Lacordaire, 1869
 Platyarthrini Bates, 1870
 Plectogasterini Quentin & Villiers, 1969
 Plectromerini Nearns & Braham, 2008
 Pleiarthrocerini Lane, 1950
 Plesioclytini Wappes & Skelly, 2015
 Proholopterini Monné, 2012
 Protaxini Gahan, 1906
 Prothemini Lacordaire, 1868
 Psebiini Lacordaire, 1869
 Pseudocephalini Aurivillius, 1912 (1861)
 Pseudolepturini Thomson, 1861
 Psilomorphini Lacordaire, 1868
 Pteroplatini Thomson, 1861
 Pyrestini Lacordaire, 1868
 Pytheini Thomson, 1864 
 Rhagiomorphini Newman, 1841
 Rhinotragini Thomson, 1860
 Rhopalophorini Blanchard, 1845
 Sestyrini Lacordaire, 1868
 Smodicini Lacordaire, 1869
 Spintheriini Lacordaire, 1869
 Stenhomalini Miroshnikov, 1989
 Stenoderini Pascoe, 1867
 Stenopterini Fairmaire, 1864
 Strongylurini Lacordaire, 1868
 Sydacini Martins, 2014
 Tessarommatini Lacordaire, 1868
 Thraniini Gahan, 1906
 Thyrsiini Marinoni & Napp, 1984
 Tillomorphini Lacordaire, 1869
 Torneutini Thomson, 1861
 Trachyderini Dupont, 1836
 Tragocerini Pascoe, 1867
 Trichomesini Pascoe, 1859
 Trigonarthrini Villiers, 1984
 Tropidini Martins & Galileo, 2007
 Tropocalymmatini Lacordaire, 1868
 Typhocesini Lacordaire, 1868
 Unxiini Napp, 2007
 Uracanthini Blanchard, 1853
 Vesperellini Sama, 2008
 Xystrocerini Blanchard, 1845

Genera incertae sedis
 Australodon Escalona & Slipinski, 2011
 Dendrides Dillon & Dillon, 1952
 Kurandanus Slipinski & Escalona, 2016
 Neclamia Lepesme & Breuning, 1952

References 

 
Cerambycidae
Beetles described in 1802